Jerry Jensen (born February 26, 1975) is a former American football linebacker who played two seasons in the National Football League for the Carolina Panthers.  He played high school football at Cascade High School in Everett, WA for the legendary Terry Ennis. He played college football at the University of Washington and was drafted in the fifth round of the 1998 NFL Draft.  Jensen was a three-year starter and team captain while at Washington. As of January 8, 2013, Jensen is now the Head Football Coach of Archbishop Murphy High School in Mill Creek, WA

References

1975 births
Living people
American football linebackers
Washington Huskies football players
Carolina Panthers players
Players of American football from California
Sportspeople from Downey, California